Westtan Broncos FC, originally Westtan Verts FC, is a Vanuatuan football team based in Port Vila. They have played in the Vanuatu Premia Divisen or Port Vila Football League, the country's top football competition.

Current squad

 

Football clubs in Vanuatu
Port Vila
Association football clubs established in 2002
2002 establishments in Vanuatu